Miss USA World 1963 was the 2nd edition of the Miss USA World pageant and it was held in Detroit, Michigan and was won by Michele Bettina Metrinko of New York City, NY. She was crowned by outgoing titleholder, Amedee Chabot of California. Metrinko went on to represent the United States at the Miss World 1963 Pageant in London later that year. She finished in the Top 14 at Miss World.

Results

Placements

Special awards

Delegates
The Miss USA World 1963 delegates were:

 Alabama - Kathy Miller
 Arkansas - Kathleen Barden
 Atlantic City, NJ - Rose Ann Jacobson
 Baltimore, MD - Kathy Alexander
 Boardman, OH - Betsy Nittoli
 Boston, MA - Nancy Joan Brackett
 Bridgeport, CT - Vivienne Eileen Dargon
 California - Shari Roark
 Connecticut - Gloria Andronick
 Detroit, MI - Terry Lynn Stern
 District of Columbia - Nancy Bailey
 Florida - Lanita Gayle Kent
 Georgia - Judy Brown
 Hawaii - Susan Molina
 Idaho - Marolane Yellen
 Illinois - Janice Hope Jordan
 Indiana - Barbara Jean Eaglen
 Iowa - Peggi Ann Matzke
 Kansas - Deborah Irene Bryant
 Kentucky - Rosalind Nelson
 Los Angeles, CA - Annette Allen
 Louisiana - Mary Carmen Fredeman
 Maine - Carol Prentice Faroni
 Massachusetts - Marion E. Sarristo
 Michigan - Charlene McKinnon
 Minnesota - Karen E. Johnson
 Missouri - Sandy Bawol
 New Jersey - Patti Burd
 New York - Elyse K. Mars
 New York City, NY - Michele Bettina Metrinko
 Ohio - Diane Budan
 Oklahoma - Glynda Quinn
 Pennsylvania - Tina Marks
 Philadelphia, PA - Frances M. Dougherty
 South Carolina - Cecelia McBride Yoder
 Tennessee - Mary Jane Barber
 Texas - Diana Ketchell
 Utah - Jane McClellan
 Vermont - Susie Vankovich
 Virginia - Faye Miriam Amy Atkinson
 Washington - La Rayne Richards
 West Virginia - Kay Rosencrance

Notes

Did not Compete

Crossovers
Contestants who competed in other beauty pageants:

Miss USA
1963:  New York City, NY: Michele Bettina Metrinko (1st Runner-Up; as )
1963: : Cecelia McBride Yoder (Top 15)
1963: : Susan Molina
1964: : Patricia Susan Marlin
1966:  Boston, MA - Nancy Joan Brackett (Top 15; as )

Miss America
1966: : Deborah Irene Bryant (Winner)

Miss American Beauty (Miss U.S. International)
1964: : Diane Budan (2nd Runner-Up)

References

External links
Miss World Official Website
Miss World America Official Website

1963 in West Virginia
World America
1963